Berinjek is a small settlement in the Municipality of Litija in central Slovenia. The area is part of the traditional region of Lower Carniola. It is now included with the rest of the municipality in the Central Sava Statistical Region; until January 2014 the municipality was part of the Central Slovenia Statistical Region.

Name
Berinjek was attested in historical documents as Berynak and Perinakch in 1420, and as Wernekg in 1463, among other spellings.

History
Berinjek was a hamlet of Suhadole until 1995, when it was made a separate settlement.

References

External links
Berinjek on Geopedia

Populated places in the Municipality of Litija